The Committee for Communities is a Northern Ireland Assembly committee established to advise, assist and scrutinise the work of the Department for Communities and Minister for Social Development (currently Nelson McCausland). The committee also plays a key role in the consultation, consideration and development of new social development legislation.

Until 2016, the committee was called the Committee for Social Development.

Membership

See also 
 Committee

References

External links 
 Committee for Social Development

Northern Ireland Assembly
Committees